Badayco Jorge Crispín Maciel (born 23 April 1981) is a Paraguayan football manager and former midfielder.

Career
Born in Las Palmas, Canary Islands, Maciel played for Real Valladolid in his birth nation before moving to Paraguay, where he represented Sport Colombia, Olimpia, General Caballero and Fernando de la Mora. After retiring, he worked as a youth coach at Deportivo Capiatá.

In February 2019, Maciel was presented as Sportivo Iteño's assistant. He was later appointed manager before being sacked in October, and later joined Sportivo Luqueño's youth categories.

On 13 September 2021, Maciel was named interim manager of Luqueño after Alfredo Berti was sacked. Seven days later, he became the official manager.

Personal life
Maciel's father Crispín was also a footballer. A forward, he spent the most of his career in Spain.

References

External links

1981 births
Living people
Footballers from Las Palmas
Paraguayan footballers
Spanish footballers
Association football midfielders
Real Valladolid Promesas players
Sport Colombia footballers
Club Olimpia footballers
General Caballero Sport Club footballers
Fernando de la Mora footballers
Paraguayan football managers
Sportivo Luqueño managers
Sportivo Trinidense managers